Rosa × odorata or Rosa odorata is a hybrid flowering plant of the genus Rosa native to Yunnan in southwest China, whose taxonomy has been confused. It has been considered a hybrid of Rosa gigantea and Rosa chinensis, or as a quite rare wild species that includes R. gigantea. The wild forms are cultivated to some extent. Cultivars were developed in China in ancient times from R. chinensis crosses, and these have been important in the ancestry of the tea-scented China roses, also called tea roses, and their descendants the hybrid tea roses.

Varieties
Four varieties of the species are recognized in the Flora of China:
 R. odorata var. odorata, with white or pink-and-white petals
 R. odorata var. gigantea, see Rosa gigantea, with white petals
 R. odorata var. pseudoindica, with yellow or orange petals
 R. odorata var. erubescens, with pale pink petals

Cultivars
The cultivar R. odorata 'Mutabilis' is widely cultivated, and is notable for the fact that the blooms change colour from yellow to pink. It prefers an open position in full sun. This cultivar has gained the Royal Horticultural Society's Award of Garden Merit.

Other cultivar names include 'Bengal Crimson' and Bengal Beauty.

References

odorata
Flora of China
Medicinal plants
Hybrid plants